The 2020 Football West season was the seventh season since the National Premier Leagues was established in Western Australia.

All NPL and grassroots competitions were suspended for one month due to the impacts from the COVID-19 pandemic in Australia, effective 18 March to 14 April, and further extended until early July. The NPL, NPL Women's and Men's State League competitions resumed from 3 July, with grassroots football having recommenced from 21 June.

Pre-season changes

League Tables

2020 National Premier Leagues WA

Only the first round of the double round-robin season was played before the competition was suspended due to restrictions relating to the coronavirus pandemic. The season resumed on 3 July, with results from the matches played in March no longer counting, and promotion/relegation being suspended. After the first 11 rounds of the season, the teams were split into an Upper Table (top 6) and a Lower Table (bottom 6), with teams in each section playing each other once, with all points and goals reset to zero. The Premier was declared as the Upper Table leader at the end of round 16. There was also a separate Finals series, between the top three teams of the Upper table, and the top team of the Lower Table, which was won by Floreat Athena. The NPL Premier normally qualifies for the national NPL finals series, but the 2020 National Premier Leagues finals series was cancelled in July.

Stage 1

Stage 2

Finals

2020 WA State League 1
The 2020 WA State League 1 season was originally scheduled to be played over 22 rounds as a double round-robin. The season commenced on 4 July, with promotion/relegation being suspended. After the first 11 rounds of the season, the teams were split into an Upper Table (top 6) and a Lower Table (bottom 6), with teams in each section playing each other once, with all points and goals reset to zero. The Champion was declared as the Upper Table leader at the end of round 16. No Premier was declared. There was also a separate Finals series, between the top three teams of the Upper table, and the top team of the Lower Table.

Stage 1

Stage 2

Finals

2020 WA State League 2
The 2020 WA State League 2 season was originally scheduled to be played over 22 rounds as a double round-robin. The season started on 4 July, with promotion/relegation being suspended. After the first 11 rounds of the season, the teams were split into an Upper Table (top 6) and a Lower Table (bottom 6), with teams in each section playing each other once, with all points and goals reset to zero. The Champion was declared as the Upper Table leader at the end of round 16. No Premier was declared. There was also a separate Finals series, between the top three teams of the Upper table, and the top team of the Lower Table.

Stage 1

Stage 2

Finals

2020 NPL Women

The 2020 NPL WA Women was the first season in the new National Premier Leagues WA Women format. It was initially meant to be played over 21 rounds as a triple round-robin, but later rescheduled as a double round-robin, with promotion/relegation being suspended. The Champion was declared as the leader at the end of round 14. No Premier was declared.

Finals

2020 State Cup
Western Australian soccer clubs commenced the Football West State Cup competition in February, only to see it suspended due to the impacts from the pandemic. At the time of suspension, only the first two rounds had been played, involving teams from various divisions of the Amateur League and Metropolitan League competitions, and from regional teams from the Goldfields, South West and Great Southern regions. With the return to competitions in June, there was a decision by Football West not to proceed with cup competitions in general. These first two rounds were part of the parallel 2020 FFA Cup preliminary rounds, which competition was also cancelled.

References

External links
Football West Official website

Soccer in Western Australia
Football West
2020
Football West season, 2020